is an indoor sporting arena located in Namba, Osaka, Japan. It first opened in 1952 and the current building was constructed in 1987. It is the venue of a professional sumo tournament (honbasho) held in March every year. The capacity of the arena is 8,000 people. Its total revenue for the 2006 fiscal year was 260 million yen, of which sumo provided 80 million.

In April 2008 the Japan Sumo Association made clear its surprise at plans by the prefectural government to demolish the gymnasium and sell the vacant lot.

In March 2012, the arena was renamed  after the naming rights were sold to sports apparel company BB Sports for the next three years. The name was changed back in April 2015, when BB Sports did not renew their deal. In June 2015, the Edion Corporation signed a three-year deal for the arena's naming rights, renaming it .

It has hosted several professional wrestling shows, including Osaka Hurricane from 2005 to 2012, NJPW Dominion from 2009 to 2014, NJPW Power Struggle since 2011, and The New Beginning in Osaka since 2012.

The venue hosted the Rizin 19 mixed martial arts fight on October 12, 2019.

Cultural references
The Osaka Prefectural Gymnasium is featured in the manga/anime series Fighting Spirit (Hajime no Ippo) as one of the venues the boxers fight at. It is also included in the video game adaptation of the series, Victorious Boxers.

Access

Namba Station - Nankai Electric Railway (250m from South Exit), Osaka Metro (350m from Exit 5)
Ōsaka Namba Station - Kintetsu Namba Line, Hanshin Namba Line (600m)
JR Namba Station - West Japan Railway Company (JR West) Kansai Main Line (Yamatoji Line) (800m)

References

External links

Official website 

Basketball venues in Japan
Indoor arenas in Japan
Osaka Evessa
Sports venues in Osaka
Sumo venues in Japan
Volleyball venues in Japan
Boxing venues in Japan
Judo venues